Burmese Americans are Americans of full or partial Burmese ancestry. The term encompasses people of all ethnic backgrounds with ancestry in present-day Myanmar (or Burma), regardless of specific ethnicity. They are a subgroup of Asian Americans.

As a small group, Burmese Americans have largely integrated into the larger Southeast Asian and South Asian American communities.

The estimated immigrant population for 2015-2019 was 147,600. Marion County, Indiana was the county with the most Burmese Americans followed by Los Angeles County.

History
The first Burmese to study in the United States was Maung Shaw Loo, an ethnic Mon, who came in 1858 to study at the University at Lewisburg (now Bucknell University) in Pennsylvania. He graduated with a medical degree in 1867 and returned the following year.

The first major wave of immigration from Myanmar occurred in the 1960s, after Ne Win established military rule in 1962, to the late 1970s. Most who immigrated were primarily those with Chinese origins, who arrived in increasing numbers following the 1967 anti-Chinese riots. The Burmese Chinese were the first major group of Theravada Buddhists to immigrate to the United States and were largely educated professionals, business entrepreneurs and technically skilled workers. A minority were of Anglo-Burmese and Indian descent. Some of the Burmese immigrated to the United States after the Immigration and Nationality Act of 1965 abolished the previously existing quota on Asian immigrants. A second wave occurred during the 1980s to the early 1990s after the national uprising in 1988. This wave consisted of many different ethnic groups, including Bamars, Karens, and those from other ethnic minorities, particularly in search of better opportunities. Among this wave are political refugees numbering a few thousand, who were involved in the 8888 Uprising and are concentrated in Fort Wayne, Indiana. From 1977 to 2000, 25,229 Burmese immigrated to the United States, although the figure is inaccurate because it does not include Burmese who immigrated via other channels or through other third countries. A third wave of immigration, from 2006 to date, has been primarily of ethnic minorities in Myanmar, in particular Karen refugees from the Thai-Burmese border. From October 2006 to August 2007, 12,800 Karen refugees resettled in the United States.

Burmese in far smaller numbers continue to immigrate to the United States today mainly through family sponsorships and the "green card lottery". Thousands of Burmese each year apply to a Diversity Visa Program (previously known as "OP" and now called "DV"), a lottery-based program that grants visas to those who wish to reside in the United States.

According to the 2010 United States Census, 100,200 persons of Burmese descent resided in the United States, an increase of 499% over the previous census, which recorded 16,720 individuals of Burmese descent. Leading up to the census, an awareness campaign was conducted by the Burmese Complete Count Committee, which consisted of Burmese American organizations, to convince Burmese Americans to self-identify as "Burmese" on their census forms. Following the 2010 census, Burmese-Americans are no longer ambiguously categorized as "Other Asian," but in a separate category.

Communities

Most Burmese Americans live in metropolitan areas with large immigrant populations. As of 2015, the metropolitan areas with the largest Burmese populations are Minneapolis-Saint Paul (with 10,000), Dallas–Fort Worth (with 7,000), Greater New York (with 7,000), the Bay Area (with 6,000), Atlanta (with 6,000), Minneapolis (with 5,000,)  Milwaukee (with around 5,000 Burmese refugees), Los Angeles (with 5,000), Indianapolis (with 4,000), Buffalo (with 4,000), Washington (with 4,000), and Des Moines (with 3,000). Other areas of significance include Tulsa, Oklahoma; Fort Wayne, Indiana, the residence of many Burmese refugees; Chicago; San Diego; and Florida.

 Minneapolis, Minnesota – Most of Minnesota's 2,500+ Karen live in the Twin Cities.
 Milwaukee, Wisconsin - "has the largest Rohingya community in the United States with a population likely over 3,000 individual."
 Chicago, Illinois - The West Ridge Community Area alone is home to over 2000 Rohingya refugees and may have the highest concentration of that ethnic group in the USA. 
 Fort Wayne, Indiana – Home to 6,000 Burmese, some sources claim this to be the largest Burmese community in U.S.
 Tulsa, Oklahoma – Home to 5,000 Chin, considered the largest concentration of Chin people in the U.S.
 Battle Creek, Michigan – Approximately 1,800 Burmese, primarily Chin.
 Dallas – A community of Chin refugees is concentrated in Lewisville.
 New York City – Queens, Brooklyn, and Northern New Jersey
 Bay Area – Daly City, Fremont, San Francisco, and San Jose
 Atlanta – DeKalb County, Georgia is home to 2,180 Burmese, primarily in Clarkston.
 Indianapolis, Indiana – specifically Perry Township Considered to be the largest Burmese-American community in the nation with 24,000 residents 
 Buffalo, New York – Upper West Side
 Washington, D.C. – Northern Virginia and Maryland, throughout Maryland but especially in Frederick County.
Baltimore, Maryland – Large numbers of Burmese refugees, especially Chin, in Baltimore and Howard Counties
 Des Moines, Waterloo, Cedar Rapids, and Dubuque, Iowa – Iowa is home to at least 8,000 Burmese residents.
 Salt Lake City, Utah – About 900 Burmese residents live in Salt lake County. 
 Bowling Green, Kentucky – Over 1000 Burmese refugees have settled in Bowling Green in recent years. 1,200 Burmese immigrants in Warren County, Kentucky as estimated by the American Community Survey for 2015–2019. 
 Nashville, Tennessee - The city has a significant Zomi refugee population largely living in South Nashville. As of 2015-2019 according to estimates from the American Community Survey, Davidson County has estimated Burmese immigrant population of 1,800 which ranks 21st nationally. 
 Syracuse, New York – Northside
 Albany, New York
 Utica, New York
 Ithaca, New York
 Philadelphia, Pennsylvania
 Hartford, Connecticut
 Chicago and Aurora, Illinois
 Omaha, Nebraska 
 Cleveland, Ohio
 Houston, Texas 
 Raleigh, North Carolina
 Lowell, Massachusetts
 Seattle-Tacoma-Bellevue, Washington
 Spokane, Washington 
 Tri-Cities, Washington
 Portland, Oregon
 Phoenix, Arizona – There are 2,500 people of Burmese descent that reside in the metro area.

Based on estimated immigrant population for 2015-2019, the largest populations by county were as follows: 

1) Marion County, Indiana ---------------------- 8,800

2) Los Angeles County, CA --------------------- 7,600

3) Ramsey County, Minnesota --------------- 6,800

4) Milwaukee County, Wisconsin------------  5,800

5) Allen County, Indiana ------------------------- 4,200

6) San Mateo County, CA ----------------------- 3,800

7) Alameda County, CA -------------------------- 3,700

8) Dallas County, Texas -------------------------- 3,500

9) Queens Borough, New York --------------- 3,400

10) Tulsa County, Oklahoma -------------------- 3,100

11) San Francisco County, CA ---------------- 2,900

12) Douglas County, Nebraska --------------- 2,600

13) Dekalb County, Georgia -------------------- 2,600

14) Polk County, Iowa ---------------------------- 2,500

15) Brooklyn Borough, New York ----------- 2,100

16) Duval County, Florida ----------------------- 2,100

17) Oneida County, New York ---------------- 2,000

18) Erie County, New York --------------------- 2,000

19) Maricopa County, Arizona --------------- 2,000

20) Wyandotte County, Kansas -------------- 2,000

Culture
As most Burmese are Buddhists, many Burmese Buddhist monasteries, most of which also serve as community centers, have sprouted across most major cities in the United States. A few ethnic Mon and Rakhine monasteries serve their respective ethnic populations. Burmese Christian churches consisting mainly of ethnic Karen, Chin, Kachin, and Anglo-Burmese congregations can also be found in large metropolitan areas. Many Christian Burmese found asylum in the U.S. as refugees.

English is the primary language for most Burmese Americans, albeit with varying levels of fluency depending on the level of education and the years lived in the country. Burmese is still widely spoken or understood as most Burmese Americans are recent immigrants or first generation children of those immigrants. Still, the command of spoken Burmese among the American-born Burmese is basic to poor, and that of written Burmese is close to none. Some older Burmese of Chinese origin speak some Chinese (typically, Mandarin, Minnan, or Cantonese); likewise some of Indian-origin speak some Indic language (usually Tamil and Hindi/Urdu).

Notable people

This is a list of notable Burmese Americans including both original immigrants who obtained American citizenship and their American descendants.

Most of these people were born in Myanmar/Burma and grew up in the United States.

 Thant Myint-U: academic, grandson of U Thant
 Rich Cho: sports executive
 Louisa Benson Craig: activist
 Edward Michael Law-Yone: journalist
 Wendy Law-Yone: writer
 Michael Aung-Thwin: historian and academic
 Robert Findlay: economist and academic
 Tin Moe: poet
 Kyi Aye: poet & novelist
 Alex Wagner: journalist and television anchor
 Kyaw Kyaw Naing: hsaing waing musician
 Aung La Nsang: mixed martial arts fighter
 Natalise: singer
 Aung San Oo: brother of Aung San Suu Kyi
 Abraham Sofaer: actor, of Burmese Jewish origin
 Ezra Solomon: economist
 Moe Z. Win: professor at Massachusetts Institute of Technology
 Adrian Zaw: actor
Moethee Zun: prominent leader in 1988 pro-democracy movement
 Maung Gyi: Martial arts teacher who introduced bando in America

Community and economic issues

Poverty
According to data released in 2017 by the Pew Research Center, approximately 35% of the Burmese American community lived under the poverty line. This is more than twice the USA average poverty rate of 16% according to data released by the Economic Policy Institute in 2011.

Median household income
Burmese Americans have an average median household income of $36,000 which is much lower than the American average of $53,600.

Per capita income
In 2014, when Americans' per capita income was divided by ethnic groups, Burmese Americans were found to be the second lowest-earning ethnic group per capita in the country, with a per capita income of $12,764, less than half of the American average of $25,825.

See also

Fresno Buddhist Temple (Mrauk Oo Dhamma)
Vipassana movement & Vipassana Research Institute
Demographics of Myanmar
Asian Americans
Myanmar–United States relations

References

Further reading
 Cooper, Amy. "Burmese Americans." Gale Encyclopedia of Multicultural America, edited by Thomas Riggs, (3rd ed., vol. 1, Gale, 2014), pp. 373–380. online

External links
 Center for Burma Studies at Northern Illinois University
  Burmese American Democratic Alliance (BADA)

Asian-American society
Southeast Asian American
American people of Burmese descent
Burmese American